Brad MacArthur (born June 14, 1975 in Wallaceburg, Ontario) is a former National Lacrosse League player.  He was drafted in 1999 by the Rochester Knighthawks, two-time NLL finalists.  Known for his faceoff prowess, MacArthur played a defender's role for the most part, although he had the ability to put the ball in the net.  He played for seven seasons in the National Lacrosse League until his retirement prior to the 2008 NLL season. MacArthur was also the head coach of the 2002 Founders Cup champion Clarington Green Gaels.

Statistics

NLL

References

1977 births
Living people
Calgary Roughnecks players
Canadian lacrosse players
Lacrosse coaches
Rochester Knighthawks players
Sportspeople from Chatham-Kent
Toronto Rock players